Mary Veronica Waldron (born 5 May 1984) is an Irish association football player and cricketer who has represented both the Republic of Ireland women's national football team and the Ireland women's cricket team. She has also stood as an umpire in cricket matches.

Football

Club career
Waldron was nominated for the FAI Under-18 Women Player of the Year in 2001 and 2002, while playing for St James's Gate. She was awarded a sport scholarship to University College Dublin in 2003. In the 2004 FAI Women's Cup final at Lansdowne Road, Waldron played in UCD's 4–1 win over Dundalk City.

In July 2004 Waldron made her UEFA Women's Cup debut for UCD; in a 5–0 defeat to Montpellier HSC.

Waldron hit an injury–time winner from the penalty spot, as St Francis beat Peamount United 2–1 in the final of the 2008 FAI Women's Cup at Richmond Park. She also played in 2009 as St Francis beat St Catherine's 1–0 to retain the Cup. In the 2011 final Waldron headed the opening goal in St Catherine's 3–1 win over Wilton United at Turners Cross.

International career
Waldron captained Ireland at Under-19 level. Coach Noel King gave her an appearance in Ireland's senior team in a 2–1 friendly win over Faroe Islands in Klaksvík on 12 October 2004. In August 2011 she reappeared for the senior team, as an 86th-minute substitute for Shannon Smyth in a 1–0 home friendly defeat to Switzerland.

Waldron also represented Irish Universities at the World University Games, playing in the 2009 tournament in Belgrade.

Cricket

In July 2010 Waldron made her One Day International debut for Ireland women's cricket team, against New Zealand at Kibworth Cricket Club New Ground. She is a wicket-keeper. In June 2018, she was named in Ireland's squad for the 2018 ICC Women's World Twenty20 Qualifier tournament. In October 2018, she was named in Ireland's squad for the 2018 ICC Women's World Twenty20 tournament in the West Indies.

In August 2019, she was named in Ireland's squad for the 2019 ICC Women's World Twenty20 Qualifier tournament in Scotland. In July 2020, she was awarded a part-time professional contract by Cricket Ireland for the following year. In November 2021, she was named in Ireland's team for the 2021 Women's Cricket World Cup Qualifier tournament in Zimbabwe.

Umpiring
Waldron is also pursuing a career as a cricket umpire. In October 2016, she became the first woman for 38 years to stand as an umpire in a men's Grade cricket match in South Australia. In August 2018, she became the first Irish woman to umpire in a men's List A fixture. In May 2019, the International Cricket Council named her as one of the eight women on the ICC Development Panel of Umpires. On 15 June 2019, she stood in her first Twenty20 International (T20I) match, between Italy and Norway, in the Regional Finals of the 2018–19 ICC T20 World Cup Europe Qualifier tournament. In September–October 2019, she stood in Australian women's domestic league, the Women's Big Bash League.

Hockey
Waldron has also played Hockey for Glenanne where her teammates included Nicola Daly and she was coached by Nikki Symmons.

See also
 List of Twenty20 International cricket umpires

References

External links
Mary Waldron at UEFA
Mary Waldron at ESPNcricinfo
Mary Waldron at CricketArchive

Republic of Ireland women's association footballers
Republic of Ireland women's international footballers
1984 births
Living people
Association footballers from Dublin (city)
Women's National League (Ireland) players
Raheny United F.C. players
UCD Women's Soccer Club players
St Francis L.F.C. players
St James's Gate F.C. players
St Catherine's L.F.C. players
Dublin Women's Soccer League players
Women's association football forwards
Republic of Ireland women's youth international footballers
Cricketers from Dublin (city)
Irish women cricketers
Ireland women One Day International cricketers
Ireland women Twenty20 International cricketers
Irish Twenty20 International cricket umpires
Irish women cricket captains
Irish cricket umpires
Women cricket umpires
Dragons (women's cricket) cricketers
Typhoons (women's cricket) cricketers
Wicket-keepers
Irish female field hockey players
Field hockey players from County Dublin
Alumni of University College Dublin
Irish women referees and umpires